Pigudu Ramudu is a 1966 Indian Telugu-language swashbuckling fantasy film directed by B. Vittalacharya. It stars N. T. Rama Rao and Rajasree, with music composed by T. V. Raju.

Plot
Once upon a time, a Kingdom was ruled by a callow Prataparudra. Exploiting it, his spitful brother-in-law Gajendra grabs the authority and acts as a tyrant. Once, Ramu a young dynamic who always figures for the good of the people spots Gajendra molesting a girl. So, he shields her by striking Gajendra and seeks apologies. Princess Madhumati the daughter of Prataparudra in disguise notices it and both crush. One night, Gajendra senses Ramu’s presence in the fort, when he stabs him in return and falls into a river. Chaya, a village girl, saves him and she too loves him. Chaya expresses his love for Ramu, but he is silent. Meanwhile, the King fixes Madhumati's alliance with Gajendra, which makes Ramu land at the fort. Unfortunately, by that time, she is missing when Gajendra accuses Ramu of it and attempts to seize him but he flies. After that, Ramu comprehends that Madhumati is under the evil clutches of Gajendra. Hence, he rescues her and reaches the forest. Whereat, envious Chaya notifies their whereabouts to Gajendra and gets them captured. Now, Gajendra dictates the King to declare the death sentence to Ramu which he denies Ergo, Gajendra imprisons him too and edicts to make Ramu blind. Here, Chaya plays and secures him. Finally, Ramu eliminates Gajendra, fuses with the two and Prataparudra crowns him.

Cast
N. T. Rama Rao as Ramu
Rajasree as Madhumathi
Rajanala as Gajendra Varma
Relangi as Maharaju
Mikkilineni as Koyadora
Padmanabham as Sivangi
Allu Ramalingaiah as Papalu
Raja Babu as Mallu
Jagga Rao as Parvathalu
Vanisri as Singi
L. Vijayalakshmi as Chaya
Rushyendramani as Ramu's mother
Manimala as Hema 
Meena Kumari as Jaya

Soundtrack

Music composed by T. V. Raju.

References

External links

1960s Telugu-language films
Indian fantasy adventure films
Films scored by T. V. Raju
Indian swashbuckler films
Films directed by B. Vittalacharya